The A5 motorway is a motorway in Croatia spanning . It connects Osijek, the largest city in Slavonia region, to the Croatian motorway network at the Sredanci interchange of the A3 motorway. The A5 represents a significant north–south transportation corridor in Croatia and is a part of the European route E73. The A5 motorway route also follows Pan-European corridor Vc. In addition to Osijek, the A5 motorway also passes near Đakovo and Beli Manastir.

The first section of the A5, joining the Sredanci interchange to Đakovo, was opened in 2007; the route to Osijek opened in 2009. In 2015, the first section south of the A3, from Sredanci interchange to Svilaj was opened, and the second one, extending to the Sava River and border of Bosnia and Herzegovina, along with the Svilaj bridge on the Croatia – Bosnia and Herzegovina border was opened in 2021. The section between Osijek and Beli Manastir was opened in 2022.

Once the entire Pan-European corridor Vc is completed, motorists will recognize the A5's importance as a transit route. When completed, the corridor shall entail the A5 itself extended to the Hungarian border and connected to the Hungarian M6 motorway as well as Bosnia and Herzegovina's A1 motorway and the A10 motorway, completing the corridor route at the Adriatic Sea coast.

The motorway consists of two traffic lanes and an emergency lane in each driving direction separated by a central reservation. All intersections of the A5 motorway are grade separated. There are five exits and four rest areas operating along the route. The motorway is tolled using a ticket system, integrated with the A3, and each exit includes a toll plaza.

Route description

The A5 is an important north–south motorway covering  in the eastern Croatian region of Slavonia, connecting the region's largest city, Osijek, to the remainder of the Croatian motorway system. The A5's southern terminus joins the A3 motorway at the Sredanci interchange; its northern terminus is near Osijek, connecting to the city's southern bypass. As a part of the road network of Croatia, the A5 is a part of European route E73. The motorway is of great importance to Croatia's economic development, especially tourism, as it represents a major southward transport route from southern Hungary. The Pan-European corridor Vc will include the A5, and its completion will highlight the importance of the A5 motorway.

The cities and towns with an immediate connection to the A5 include Beli Manastir via the D517, Đakovo via the D7 and Čepin via the Ž4105 county road. The A5 motorway consists of two traffic lanes and an emergency lane in each driving direction, with carriageways separated by the median. All existing interchanges are trumpet interchanges, except for Sredanci, which is a cloverleaf. The A5 features a number of rest areas which provide various services including restrooms, filling stations and restaurants. The motorway has four interchanges, providing access to several towns and cities and the Croatian state road network. The motorway is maintained and operated by the state-owned management company Hrvatske autoceste.

An automatic traffic monitoring and guidance system is in place along the motorway. It consists of measuring, control and signaling devices, located in zones where driving conditions may vary—at interchanges, near viaducts and bridges, and areas where fog is common. The system uses variable traffic signs to communicate driving conditions, possible restrictions and other information to motorists.

The A5 motorway runs through plains crossed by a number of watercourses and railways running perpendicular to the motorway route, requiring a variety of bridges and viaducts. Particular attention to the environment is also necessary, due to water supply and natural heritage zones, as well as nearby agricultural production.

Toll

The A5 is a tolled motorway based on the vehicle classification in Croatia using a closed toll system. Toll charged along the A5 route between Osijek and the Sredanci interchange depends on the route traveled and ranges from 4.00 kuna (0.54 euro) to 30.00 kuna (4.05 euro) for passenger cars and 13.00 kuna (1.76 euro) to 98.00 kuna (13.24 euro) for semi-trailer trucks. Motorcycles are charged approximately half of the passenger car rate. The toll is payable in either Croatian kuna or euros using major credit cards, debit cards and a number of prepaid toll collection systems. The latter include smart cards issued by the motorway operator and ENC, an electronic toll collection system which is used by motorways across Croatia, with discounted rates for dedicated lanes at toll plazas. Toll collection systems along the A5 and A3 are unified; vehicles switching from one motorway to the other at Sredanci, for example, do not pass toll plazas at the interchange.

In the first half of 2011 Hrvatske autoceste collected 508.1 million kuna (68.7 million euro) in toll revenue, an increase of 2.25% compared to the same period in 2010. However, the company reports revenue for the entire motorway network and does not provide data for individual motorways.

History

The first section of the A5 motorway, covering  between the Sredanci interchange and Đakovo was opened on 9 November 2007. This was Croatia's first commitment to improve transport facilities along the Pan-European transport corridor Vc, while providing a feeder motorway to the A3 toward Osijek, the largest city in the east of the country. Hrvatske autoceste invested 1.4 billion kuna (189 million euro) to construct the first section, completed in eighteen months by a consortium of Croatian construction companies. When the first section opened, construction on a second stretch of the A5, reaching  between Đakovo and Osijek, was announced on 15 November, with completion scheduled for December 2008.

The route extension to Osijek was delayed by four months, but opened on 17 April 2009. The construction works were completed in 17 months at a price of 2.13 billion kuna (287 million euro). Completion of this section marked the start of toll collection on the A5 motorway. The motorway is nicknamed "Slavonika", presumably because it spans Slavonia from north to south, although the Sredanci interchange with the A3 motorway is also called Slavonika by some media.

In general, motorways in Croatia have led to a positive economic impact on the cities and towns they connected, as well as aiding tourism in Croatia.

The construction of the bridge across the Drava continued in 2016 and finished in 2018, while the next section to bridge Halasica and Beli Manastir.

The contract on the construction of the A5 motorway section Halasica-Beli Manastir, on the international traffic Vc corridor, worth HRK 443 million without VAT, was signed on 28 April 2020 between Hrvatske autoceste and the contractors. Only one offer was received for the tender, business associations of the companies "Osijek Koteks" and GP "Krk", which plan is to complete the  section by the middle of 2022. The project is co-financed by the European Bank for Reconstruction and Development and the Croatian Bank for Reconstruction and Development.

The section between the Osijek interchange, across the  Drava bridge, to the Sudaraš exit at Beli Manastir was opened in December 2022, at a total cost of 126 million EUR.

Further construction 

The plan to complete the A5 motorway to the border with Hungary is by the end of 2023. This is planned as a  section.

Traffic volume 

Traffic is regularly counted and reported by Hrvatske autoceste, the operator of the motorway, and is published by Hrvatske ceste. Variations between AADT and average summer daily traffic (ASDT) traffic volumes are attributed to the fact that the motorway carries substantial tourist traffic to the Adriatic Sea resorts during the summer.

The variations between the AADT and the ASDT traffic volumes are attributed to the fact that the motorway carries certain tourist traffic from Hungary to the Croatian motorway network and ultimately to the Adriatic Sea. On average the motorway carries 15% increased volume of traffic during summer months. As the Hungarian M6 motorway is gradually extended towards the Croatian border and the A5 motorway's northern terminus, the number of tourists traveling along this route in summer months is increasing.

Rest areas

There are four rest areas along the A5 motorway. Legislation identifies four types of rest areas: A-type rest areas comprise a full range of amenities, including a filling station, a restaurant and a hotel or motel; B-type rest areas have no lodging; C-type rest areas are very common and include a filling station and a café, but no restaurants or accommodations; D-type rest areas only offer parking spaces, possibly picnicking tables and benches and restrooms. Most rest areas along the A2 motorway generally follow this ranking system, although some offer extra services. Many filling stations along the Croatian motorway network have small convenience stores, and some offer LPG fuel.

The primary motorway operator, Hrvatske autoceste (HAC), leases the A, B and C type rest areas to various operators through public tenders. There is a single such rest area operator on the A5 motorway: Petrol. The rest area operators are not permitted to sub-lease fuel operations. The A5 motorway rest areas are accessible from both directions of the motorway and operate 24 hours a day, seven days a week.

{| class="wikitable"
|-
| style="text-align:center; background:#f2f2f2;" colspan="6"| List of A5 motorway rest areas
|- style="text-align:center; background:#f2f2f2;"
|| County
|| km
|| Name
|| Operators
|| Type
|| Notes
|-
| rowspan=3|Osijek‑Baranja
| 42.2
| Beketinci
| OMV
| C
| Beketinci rest area contains parking spaces only. As of September 2011, a filling station and a café are under construction at the rest area.
|-
| 52.5
| Štrosmajerovac
| 
| D
| Štrosmajerovac rest area contains parking spaces only.
|-
| 68.4
| Ivandvor
| Petrol
| B
| Ivandvor rest area facilities comprise a filling station, a restaurant, a café, restrooms and picnicking areas.
|-
| Brod‑Posavina
| 78.6
| Andrijevci
| 
| D
| Andrijevci rest area contains a café and restrooms.

Exit list

{| class="wikitable"
|-
!scope="col"|County
!scope="col"|km
!scope="col"|Exit
!scope="col"|Name
!scope="col"|Destination
!scope="col"|Notes
|-
| rowspan=7 |Osijek-Baranja
| bgcolor=#ddffdd |29.5
| bgcolor=#ddffdd align=center | 3
| bgcolor=#ddffdd |Osijek
| bgcolor=#ddffdd |
| bgcolor=#ddffdd |Connection to Osijek (south), Bizovac and Belišće (via the D34)The northern terminus of the motorway and of the European route E73 concurrency
|-
|
| align=center |
| colspan=3 |Osijek toll plaza
|-
| 38.4
| align=center | 4
| Čepin
| 
| Connection to Čepin
|-
| 42.2
| align=center |
| colspan=3 |Beketinci rest area
|-
| 52.5
| align=center |
| colspan=3 |Štrosmajerovac rest area
|-
| 62.0
| align=center | 5
| Đakovo
| 
| Connection to Đakovo and Vrpolje
|-
| 68.4
| align=center |
| colspan=3 |Ivandvor rest area
|-
| rowspan=5 | Brod-Posavina
| 73.7
| colspan=4 align=center |HŽ Andrijevci Viaduct
|-
| 78.6
| align=center |
| colspan=3 |Andrijevci rest area
|-
| 85.0
| align=center | 6
| Sredanci
|
|Connection to the A3 motorway (E70) connecting Slavonski Brod and Zagreb (to the west) and Županja and Belgrade, Serbia (to the east).
|-
| 86.8
| align=center | 7
|Svilaj
|
|Connection to Svilaj; Opened in 2014.
|-
| bgcolor=#ddffdd |88.5
| bgcolor=#ddffdd align=center |
| bgcolor=#ddffdd |Svilaj border crossing
| bgcolor=#ddffdd | A1
| bgcolor=#ddffdd |Svilaj border crossing to Bosnia and Herzegovina; The route continues into Bosnia and Herzegovina as the A1 motorway towards Sarajevo. The southern terminus of the motorway; Opened in September 2021.

See also 

 International E-road network
 Transport in Croatia

References

Motorways in Croatia